Artem Topchanyuk (born 27 January 1989) is a Ukrainian road racing cyclist, who last rode for UCI Continental team .

Major results

2010
 National Road Championships
1st  Hill climb
1st  Under-23 road race
 7th Overall Tour of Szeklerland
2011
 3rd Memorial Oleg Dyachenko
 3rd Golan II
 4th Road race, UEC European Under-23 Road Championships
 5th Overall Cycling Tour of Sibiu
 8th Golan I
2012
 3rd Overall Cycling Tour of Sibiu
 4th Overall Five Rings of Moscow
 6th Circuit d'Alger
2014
 2nd Overall Tour of Arad
2015
 3rd Overall Tour de Serbie
 3rd Odessa Grand Prix 1

References

External links

1989 births
Living people
Ukrainian male cyclists
Place of birth missing (living people)